Nevel is a town and the administrative center of Nevelsky District in Pskov Oblast, Russia, located on Lake Nevel  southeast of Pskov, the administrative center of the oblast. Population:

History

Nevel was first mentioned in Ivan the Terrible's will among towns that had been founded during his reign. Between 1580 and 1772, it frequently changed ownership. In 1623, it was granted Magdeburg rights by the Polish King Władysław IV Vasa. While part of the Polish–Lithuanian Commonwealth it was located in the Połock Voivodeship. It finally passed to Russia during the First Partition of Poland in 1772, when it was included into newly established Pskov Governorate, chartered, and made the seat of Nevesky Uyezd of Pskov Governorate. In 1777, it was transferred to Polotsk Viceroyalty. In 1796, the viceroyalty was abolished and Nevel was transferred to the Belarusian Governorate; it formed a part of Vitebsk Governorate from 1802.

In early 1919 it was part of the Socialist Soviet Republic of Byelorussia. After 1919, Vitebsk Governorate was a part of the Russian Soviet Federative Socialist Republic. On March 24, 1924, Vitebsk Governorate was abolished, and Nevel was transferred to Pskov Governorate.

On August 1, 1927, the uyezds and governorates were abolished and Nevelsky District, with the administrative center in Nevel, was established as a part of Velikiye Luki Okrug of Leningrad Oblast. It included parts of former Nevelsky Uyezd. On June 3, 1929, Nevelsky District was transferred to Western Oblast. On July 23, 1930, the okrugs were also abolished and the districts were directly subordinated to the oblast. On January 29, 1935, Western Oblast was abolished and the district was transferred to Kalinin Oblast, and on February 5 of the same year, Nevelsky District became a part of Velikiye Luki Okrug of Kalinin Oblast, one of the okrugs abutting the state boundaries of the Soviet Union. On May 4, 1938, the district was subordinated directly to the oblast. During World War II, Nevel was under German occupation from 16 July 1941 until 6 October 1943. On August 22, 1944, the district was transferred to newly established Velikiye Luki Oblast. On October 2, 1957, Velikiye Luki Oblast was abolished and Nevelsky District was transferred to Pskov Oblast.

Administrative and municipal status
Within the framework of administrative divisions, Nevel serves as the administrative center of Nevelsky District, to which it is directly subordinated. As a municipal division, the town of Nevel is incorporated within Nevelsky Municipal District as Nevel Urban Settlement.

Economy

Industry
Nevel has enterprises of food, textile, shoemaking, and timber industries.

Transportation 

Nevel is connected at the crossing of two railway lines. One connects Velikiye Luki with Polotsk (Nevel-1 railway station), whereas another one connects St. Petersburg via Dno and Novosokolniki with Vitebsk (Nevel-2 railway station). South of Nevel, both railways cross into Belarus.

There M20 Highway connecting St. Petersburg and Kyiv passes next to Nevel. Other main roads connect Nevel with Velikiye Luki, with Smolensk via Usvyaty and Velizh, with Polotsk, and with Verkhnyadzvinsk via Rossony. There are also local roads.

Culture

Nevel contains three objects classified as cultural and historical heritage of local significance. The monuments are the Trinity Church (built in the 1850s), the building of the uyezd school, and the military cemetery from World War II.

Nevel is home to the Nevel Museum of History, featuring the history of the town.

Notable people
 Mikhail Bakhtin (1895-1975) — Russian philosopher, literary critic and semiotician
 Maria Yudina (1899-1970) —  Soviet pianist
 Reb Zalman Moishe (1872—1952) —  Orthodox Jewish Chabad-Lubavitch Rabbi in pre-war Europe
 Yevgeny Dyakonov (1935-2006) —  Russian mathematician
 Filipp Goloshchyokin (1876-1941) —  Soviet politician and revolutionary 
 Manshuk Mametova (1922-1943) —  Soviet Kazakh machine gunner, first Soviet Asian woman to receive the Hero of the Soviet Union medal
 Aaron Rubashkin (1927/28–2020) — Jewish-American businessman
 Grigori Voitinsky (1893-1953) —  Soviet politician
 Morris S. Novik (1903–1996) —  American socialist politician and radio manager
 Dov Schwartzman (1921–2011) —   Haredi Jewish rabbi and dean of Bais Hatalmud (Jerusalem)
 Valentin Voloshinov (1895-1936) — Russian philosopher and linguist
 Konstantin Zaslonov (1910-1942) —  Soviet partisan kommander, Hero of the Soviet Union

References

Notes

Sources

Архивный отдел Псковского облисполкома. Государственный архив Псковской области. "Административно-территориальное деление Псковской области (1917–1988 гг.). Справочник". (Administrative-Territorial Structure of Pskov Oblast (1917–1988). Reference.) Книга I. Лениздат, 1988

External links
 The murder of the Jews of Nevel during World War II, at Yad Vashem website.

Cities and towns in Pskov Oblast
Nevelsky Uyezd
Holocaust locations in Russia
Nevelsky District, Pskov Oblast